Michael Gerber (born January 15, 1970 in Oberkirch) is a German Roman Catholic bishop of Roman Catholic Diocese of Fulda.

Life 
Gerber studied Catholic theology and philosophy. On 11 May 1997 Gerber was ordained priest in Freiburg im Breisgau. On 12 June 2013 Gerber was appointed as auxiliary bishop of Freiburg im Breisgau.<ref>Erzbistum verabschiedet Weihbischof Gerber (german),  12 June 2013</ref> On 8 September 2013 Gerber became titular bishop of Migirpa. On 31 March 2019 Gerber became bishop of Fulda.Fuldaer Zeitung: Neue Karte im Bischofsquartettspiel: Michael Gerber

 Positions 
In June 2021 Gerber supported reforms at Synodal path in Germany. He supports women ordination, married priests and blessing for same-sex unions.

 Works by Gerber 
 Zur Liebe berufen. Pastoraltheologische Kriterien für die Formung geistlicher Berufe in Auseinandersetzung mit Luigi M. Rulla und Josef Kentenich. Echter Verlag, Würzburg 2008,  (dissertation).
 Barfuß klettern. Ermutigungen für Christen heute. Herder, Freiburg 2015, .

 References 

 External links 
 
 Erzbistum Freiburg: Erzbistum verabschiedet Weihbischof Gerber'' (German),  12 June 2013
 Badische Zeitung: Michael Gerber – der päpstliche Quartiergeber (German), 13 September 2011
 Fuldaer Zeitung: Neue Karte im Bischofsquartettspiel: Michael Gerber

Living people
1970 births
21st-century German Roman Catholic bishops
21st-century Roman Catholic bishops in Germany
Roman Catholic bishops of Fulda